Ocean Forest Country Club, also known as Ocean Forest Hotel and Country Club, is a historic country club and hotel located at Myrtle Beach in Horry County, South Carolina. The club and hotel were designed by an influential New York architect, Raymond Hood (1881-1934) and is an unusual example of Classical Revival architecture. Construction of the club began in 1926 and was completed in 1927. In addition to the hotel / club building, a 27-hole golf course was built in association with the club.  It was designed by Robert White, a golf course designer and future president of the Professional Golfers' Association of America. The present 18-hole course dates to 1946.

It was listed on the National Register of Historic Places in 1996.

References

External links
Ocean Forest Country Club - Myrtle Beach, South Carolina - U.S. National Register of Historic Places on Waymarking.com

Hotel buildings on the National Register of Historic Places in South Carolina
Clubhouses on the National Register of Historic Places in South Carolina
Neoclassical architecture in South Carolina
Golf clubs and courses in South Carolina
Hotel buildings completed in 1927
Buildings and structures in Myrtle Beach, South Carolina
Hotels in South Carolina
National Register of Historic Places in Horry County, South Carolina